The International Fellowship of Evangelical Students (IFES) is an interdenominational association of 180 evangelical Christian student movements worldwide, encouraging evangelism, discipleship and mission among students. The headquarters is in Oxford, England.

History
In United Kingdom, the Oxford Inter-Collegiate Christian Union, founded in 1879, was a founding member of the Student Christian Movement of Great Britain (SCM) in 1892. Then in 1928, students left SCM due to differences over liberal positions and founded the Inter-Varsity Christian Fellowship. This movement was established in Canada in 1928 and in the United States in 1941.

In 1947, the International Fellowship of Evangelical Students was founded. Representatives from Australia, the United Kingdom, Canada, China, Netherlands, Norway, France, New Zealand, Switzerland, and the United States came together in Boston (USA) to strengthen evangelism, discipleship and world mission among students all over the world. 

It was present in 180 countries in 2023.

Programs
Group meetings are held each week to discuss the Bible in universities. These groups are Evangelical, but not attached to any particular confession.

Organization
Representatives of all the member movements gather once every four years at the "World Assembly", where the General Committee meets to conduct official business of the fellowship. IFES's General Secretaries have included:
 Stacey Woods (1947–1972)
 Chua Wee Hian (1972–1991)
 Lindsay Brown (1991–2007)
 Daniel Bourdanné (2007–2019)
 Jamil Chabouh (acting, 2019–2020)
 Tim Adams (2021–present)

Publishing houses
Christian literature distribution is also a feature of this ministry. InterVarsity Press (USA), Inter-Varsity Press (UK), Presses Bibliques Africaines (Francophone Africa), Harmat (Hungary), Andamio (Spain), and Ediciones Certeza (Latin America) are examples of regional publishing houses.

See also

Cru Christian campus ministry
Passion Conferences Founded by Louie Giglio to provide annual gathering of Christian students
World Student Christian Federation
Lausanne Movement, to which many IFES members have contributed
Langham Partnership, to which many IFES members have contributed
UCCF (formerly IVF)

References

Bibliography
 Douglas Johnson, A Brief History of the International Fellowship Of Evangelical Students, Lausanne, Switzerland, IFES, 1964.
 Pete Lowman, The Day of His Power, Leicester, Inter-Varsity, 1988. 
 Alice Poynor, From the Campus to the World: Stories from the First Fifty Years of Student Foreign Missions Fellowship, InterVarsity Press, 1986. 
 David M. Howard, Student Power in World Missions, InterVarsity Press, 1979.  (Brief history of North American students in mission beginning with the Haystack Movement through the SVM to the SFMF.)
 C. Stacey Woods, The Growth of a Work of God, InterVarsity Press, 1978.  (Early history of InterVarsity/USA)
 Keith & Gladys Hunt, For Christ and the University: The Story of InterVarsity Christian Fellowship of the U.S.A./ 1940-1990, InterVarsity Press, 1991. 
 Lindsay Brown, Shining Like Stars - the Power of the Gospel in the World’s Universities, Inter-Varsity Press, 2006.  (Spanish translation: Brillando Como Estrellas, Andamio. , 
 A. Donald Macleod, C. Stacey Woods and the Evangelical Rediscovery of the University, Downers Grove: InterVarsity Press, 2007. 
 Luke Cawley, "Campus Lights: Students Living and Speaking for Jesus Around the World", Edinburgh: Muddy Pearl, 2019.

External links 

Preview of "Brillando Como Estrellas", an introduction and history of IFES by Lindsay Brown (in Spanish)

Evangelical parachurch organizations
International student religious organizations
Organisations based in Oxford
Christian organizations established in 1947
Fellowships
Christianity in Oxford